Ben Smith (born 15 May 2002 in Grimsby) is an English professional squash player. As of November 2022, he was ranked number 95 in the world. He won the 2022 Breda Open.

References

2002 births
Living people
English male squash players